Station 19 is an American action-drama television series created by Stacy McKee for ABC that premiered on March 22, 2018. It is the second spin-off of Grey's Anatomy (after Private Practice). Set in Seattle, the series focuses on the lives of the men and women at Seattle Fire Station 19. It stars Jaina Lee Ortiz, Jason George, Grey Damon, Barrett Doss, Alberto Frezza, Jay Hayden, Okieriete Onaodowan, Danielle Savre, Miguel Sandoval, Boris Kodjoe, Stefania Spampinato, Carlos Miranda, Josh Randall, Merle Dandridge, and Pat Healy.

McKee, Shonda Rhimes, Betsy Beers, and Paris Barclay serve as executive producers on the series. It is produced by Shondaland and ABC Signature, with McKee serving as showrunner for its first two seasons, later replaced by Krista Vernoff since season three.

In May 2017, the spin-off received a series order from ABC. Ortiz was cast in July 2017, and the cast was filled out by October. Filming for the series takes place primarily in Los Angeles. In March 2020, ABC renewed the series for a fourth season, which premiered on November 12, 2020. In May 2021, the series was renewed for a fifth season, which premiered on September 30, 2021. In January 2022, the series was renewed for a sixth season, which premiered on October 6, 2022.

Premise
The series follows a group of firefighters of the Seattle Fire Department at Station 19 from the captain down the ranks to the newest recruit in their personal and professional lives.

Cast and characters
  = Main cast (credited)
  = Recurring cast (3+)
  = Guest cast (1-2)

Cast notes

Main
 Jaina Lee Ortiz as Andrea "Andy" Herrera: A Lieutenant at Station 19 and the headstrong daughter of Captain Pruitt Herrera. She was a Co-Acting Captain of Station 19. In the season 2 finale and in season 3, her new love interest is the new captain, Robert Sullivan, whom she marries prior to her father's death. At the start of season 5, she is forcibly transferred to Station 23 for protesting Maya's demotion from Captain at the end of the previous season.
 Jason George as Dr. Benjamin "Ben" Warren, MD: A firefighter and PRT Physician at Station 19 and a former anesthesiologist-turned-surgical-resident at Grey Sloan Memorial Hospital. He is married to Miranda Bailey.
 Grey Damon as Jack Gibson: Lieutenant at Station 19. He is passionate, energetic, and fearless. He was one of Station 19's Co-Acting Captains, along with Herrera.
 Barrett Doss as Victoria "Vic" Hughes: A younger, big-hearted firefighter at Station 19. Hughes is close friends with her fellow firefighters.
 Alberto Frezza as Ryan Tanner (main seasons 1–2, recurring season 3): A police officer at Seattle PD. He and Andy were longtime friends and had a romantic relationship in high school. He was shot in the second episode of season 3, and died in the third episode.
 Jay Hayden as Travis Montgomery: An openly gay firefighter and the heart of Station 19. Montgomery is a widower, having lost his husband Michael, a fellow firefighter. In season six, he runs for mayor of Seattle against Michael Dixon.
 Okieriete Onaodowan as Dean Miller (seasons 1–5): A charismatic firefighter at Station 19. In season 3, he becomes a dad to a baby girl he names after Cpt. Pruitt Herrera. In season 5, he is mortally wounded following a gas explosion at a call and dies en route to the hospital.
 Danielle Savre as Maya DeLuca-Bishop: A bisexual, Type-A Lieutenant, and later Captain, at Station 19 and a former Olympic athlete. She is Carina's wife and Andy's best friend. At the start of season 5, she is demoted back to Lieutenant for breaking protocol to save a life.
 Miguel Sandoval as Pruitt Herrera (seasons 1–3, guest season 4): Captain at Station 19, Andy’s father, and a mentor to her and her coworkers. He steps down from his role in the series premiere, and later dies in season 3 while at the scene of a fire call.
 Boris Kodjoe as Robert Sullivan (season 2–present): The new Captain at Station 19 who recently returned to Seattle. In "Eulogy", he is promoted to Battalion Chief. Prior to being Captain he was the General at the Academy where Miller and Gibson were training. He was once best friends with Chief Ripley but their friendship faded when Robert moved to Montana after his wife's death. Sullivan suffers from complex regional pain syndrome (CRPS). In the season 2 finale and season 3, he becomes Andy's new love interest. Sullivan marries Andy in season 3 before Pruitt's death. At the start of season 4, he is demoted back to regular firefighter due to his actions that resulted from his opioid addiction. He is re-promoted to Lieutenant half-way through season 5 by his old friend, new SFD chief Natasha Ross.
 Stefania Spampinato as Dr. Carina DeLuca-Bishop (season 4–present; recurring season 3): An openly bisexual OB/GYN Attending at Grey Sloan Memorial Hospital and Maya's wife.
Carlos Miranda as Theodore “Theo” Ruiz (season 5–present; recurring season 4): Lieutenant at Station 23 and Michael Williams' old captain.
Josh Randall as Fire Captain Sean Beckett (season 6; recurring season 5): The newly appointed Fire Captain of Station 19. He is smug, chauvinistic, and rather incompetent at his job. He cares more about maintaining a good appearance for the station as he fails to understand the value of Station 19's engine, which was dedicated to Cpt. Pruitt Herrera, when it was destroyed in a gas fire.
Merle Dandridge as Fire Chief Natasha Ross (season 6; recurring season 5): The new Fire Chief for the Seattle Fire Department as the replacement for Chief McCallister and has a previous history with Sullivan.
Pat Healy as Fire Chief Michael Dixon (season 6; recurring seasons 3–4; guest season 5): The new Fire Chief for the Seattle Fire Department as the replacement of Lucas Ripley. He returned to be a police officer after he was fired at the end of season 3. In season 6, he announced his candidacy for mayor.

Recurring
Marla Gibbs as Edith (season 1): A feisty retirement home retiree who sets up Travis with her grandson, Grant.
Brett Tucker as Fire Chief Lucas Ripley (seasons 1–2, guest season 3): The Fire Chief for Seattle Fire Department. He dies after a fire and leaves behind his friends and colleagues at the Seattle Fire Department.
Brenda Song as JJ (seasons 1, 3): A music reviewer who Dean saves from a fire and later begins to date. In season three, she has a baby with Dean, but she left as she feels incompetent in motherhood.
Sterling Sulieman as Grant (seasons 1–2): The sous chef grandson of Edith who she sets up with Travis.
Dermot Mulroney as Greg Tanner (season 2): Ryan's father.
Birgundi Baker as Yemi Miller (season 2), Dean's sister.
Rigo Sanchez as Rigo Vasquez (season 3; guest season 6): A firefighter at Station 19. He has problems working with Jack Gibson because he slept with Rigo's wife. The tension between the two comes to a head at the firehouse and while on a call he gets injured during a rescue and before being discharged out of the hospital, he dies.
Kelly Thiebaud as Eva Vasquez (seasons 3, 6): Rigo's wife. She had a sexual relationship with Jack.
Lachlan Buchanan as Emmett Dixon (seasons 3–5): A probationary firefighter at Station 19 and the son of Fire Chief Dixon. He broke up with Travis and left to travel the world in Season 5.
Jayne Taini as Marsha Smith (seasons 3–4; guest season 5): An elderly woman who becomes a maternal figure for Gibson.
Colleen Foy as Inara (season 4; guest season 3): A friend of Jack after he rescued her and her son from an abusive husband.
Ansel Sluyter-Obidos as Marcus (season 4; guest season 3): Inara’s son who is deaf. He communicates with people through ASL
Robert Curtis Brown as Paul Montgomery (seasons 4–5): Travis' dad. He was also portrayed by Kenneth Meseroll in season 3 and one episode of season 4.
Jeanne Sakata as Nari Montgomery (season 4; guest season 5): Travis’ mom.
Lindsey Gort as Ingrid Saunders (season 5): a widow whose shop caught fire. She had a crush on Ben Warren until she found out he was married.
Alain Uy as Captain Pat Aquino (season 5): The Fire Captain of Station 23.
Natasha Ward as Deja Duval (season 5): A probie firefighter at Station 23 that Andy is mentoring as she’s the only other woman there. 
Barbara Eve Harris as Ifeya Miller (season 5; guest seasons 2, 4): Dean's mom.
Jeffrey D. Sams as Bill Miller (season 5; guest seasons 2, 4): Dean’s dad.
Jennifer Jalene as Luisa Berrol (season 5): Andy’s lawyer.
Rob Heaps as Eli Stern (season 6): Travis’ campaign manager.

Notable guests
BJ Tanner as William George “Tuck” Jones (seasons 1, 3–5): Warren's stepson.
Jee Young Han as Charlotte Dearborn (seasons 1–2): The Fire Lieutenant of Station 12, who competes against Herrera and Gibson for Captain.
Patrick Duffy as Terry (season 2) who appears in the episode "Into the Wildfire".
Nyle DiMarco as Dylan (season 2): A deaf firefighter who appears in the episode "Into the Wildfire".
Jonathan Bennett as Michael Williams (season 3–4): Travis’ deceased husband
Tracie Thoms as Dr. Diane Lewis (seasons 3–6): A therapist who assisted and evaluated professional and personal concerns the staff at Station 19 have individually.
Khalilah Joi as Condola Vargas (season 4): a lawyer who has a romantic history with Dean
Michael Grant Terry as Officer Jones (season 6): a Police Officer who appears in the episode "We Build Then We Break".

Grey's Anatomy
Chandra Wilson as Dr. Miranda Bailey (recurring seasons 1, 3, 5; guest seasons 2, 4): Chief of Surgery at Grey Sloan Memorial Hospital and Ben Warren's wife.
Ellen Pompeo as Dr. Meredith Grey (guest seasons 1, 3 and 6): Chief of General Surgery at Grey Sloan Memorial Hospital.
Jake Borelli as Dr. Levi Schmitt (guest seasons 1–4): A resident at Grey Sloan Memorial Hospital.
Giacomo Gianniotti as Dr. Andrew DeLuca (guest seasons 2, 4): A surgical resident, and later attending at Grey Sloan Memorial Hospital, and the brother of Carina DeLuca.
Kelly McCreary as Dr. Maggie Pierce (guest seasons 2–3, 6): Co-Chief of Cardiothoracic Surgery at Grey Sloan Memorial Hospital.
Jesse Williams as Dr. Jackson Avery (recurring season 3): Chief of Plastic Surgery at Grey Sloan Memorial Hospital.
Caterina Scorsone as Dr. Amelia Shepherd (guest seasons 3–4, 6): Chief of Neurosurgery at Grey Sloan Memorial Hospital.
Kevin McKidd as Dr. Owen Hunt (guest seasons 3–5): Chief of Trauma Surgery at Grey Sloan Memorial Hospital
Greg Germann as Dr. Tom Koracick (guest season 3): Chief of Hospitals at Catherine Fox Foundation, Attending Neurosurgeon at Grey Sloan Memorial Hospital.
Kim Raver as Dr. Teddy Altman (guest seasons 3, 5-6): Co-Chief of Cardiothoracic Surgery and former Chief of Trauma Surgery at Grey Sloan Memorial Hospital
Alex Landi as Dr. Nico Kim (recurring season 3): Doctor at Grey Sloan Memorial Hospital and Levi's boyfriend.
Jaicy Elliot as Dr. Taryn Helm (guest seasons 3–5): A resident at Grey Sloan Memorial Hospital.
Alex Blue Davis as Dr. Casey Parker (guest season 3): A resident at Grey Sloan Memorial Hospital.
Vivian Nixon as Dr. Hannah Brody (guest season 3): A resident at Grey Sloan Memorial Hospital.
Devin Way as Dr. Blake Simms (guest season 3): A resident at Grey Sloan Memorial Hospital.
James Pickens Jr. as Dr. Richard Webber (recurring season 4, guest season 5): Chief Medical Officer, Senior Attending General Surgeon, Director of the Residency Program and former Chief of Surgery at Grey Sloan Memorial Hospital. He becomes Sullivan's addict recovery sponsor.
Zaiver Sinnett as Dr. Zander Perez (guest season 4)
Niko Terho as Dr. Lucas Adams (guest season 6)
Anthony Hill as Dr. Winston Ndugu (guest season 6)
Harry Shum Jr. as Dr. Benson "Blue" Kwan (guest season 6)
Aniela Gumbs as Zola Grey Shepherd (guest season 6)

Episodes

Production

Development
On May 16, 2017, ABC chief Channing Dungey announced at ABC's upfront presentation that the network had given a straight-to-series order for a second Grey's Anatomy spin-off. Stacy McKee, a long-term Grey's writer and executive producer, will serve as showrunner and executive producer, with Shonda Rhimes and Betsy Beers also serving as executive producers. The series, which would be set in a Seattle firehouse, would follow the lives of a group of firefighters. The order consisted of 10 episodes. When announcing the series, Dungey said, "No one can interweave the jeopardy firefighters face in the line of duty with the drama in their personal lives quite like Shonda, and Grey's signature Seattle setting is the perfect backdrop for this exciting spinoff." Patrick Moran, president at ABC Studios, added that "We talked [with Shonda] about the elements of Grey's Anatomy that seem to resonate with the audience—emotional storytelling, deep human connection, a high-stakes environment and strong and empowered women—and those elements will carry over to the spinoff." In July 2017, Paris Barclay signed on to the series as producing director and executive producer. In January 2018, it was announced that Ellen Pompeo had renewed her contract to portray Meredith Grey through season 16 of Grey's, in addition to becoming a producer on the show and a co-executive producer on the spin-off. Later that month, ABC announced that the series would be titled Station 19.

An episode of Grey's Anatomy, originally planned to air in fall 2017 but instead set to air in March 2018, will serve as a backdoor pilot for the series. The backdoor pilot episode will feature the introduction of the lead character of the spin-off, Andy Herrera, "as a story within the episode" and "showcase a really lovely story for Ben, where we get to just juxtapose his two worlds and see his reaction as he transitions from one world to the next".

On May 11, 2018, ABC renewed the series for a second season. The second season premiered on October 4, 2018. On October 19, 2018, it was announced that ABC had ordered a full season for the second season. On May 10, 2019, the series was renewed for a third season which premiered on January 23, 2020. On March 11, 2020, the series was renewed for a fourth season which premiered on November 12, 2020. On May 10, 2021, ABC renewed the series for a fifth season which premiered on September 30, 2021. On January 11, 2022, ABC renewed the series for a sixth season which premiered on October 6, 2022.

Casting
On July 26, 2017, Jaina Lee Ortiz was cast as the female lead, Andrea "Andy" Herrera. In September 2017, it was announced that Jason George, who has played Dr. Ben Warren since season 6 of Grey's Anatomy, would be leaving the series to join the spin-off as a series regular. On October 6, 2017, Grey Damon was cast as Lieutenant Jack Gibson, Jay Hayden as Travis Montgomery, Okieriete Onaodowan as Dean Miller, Danielle Savre as Maya Bishop, and Barrett Doss as Victoria "Vic" Hughes. They were shortly followed by Miguel Sandoval as Captain Pruitt Herrera, and Alberto Frezza as police officer, Ryan Tanner.

Filming
Filming for the first season began on October 18, 2017, and concluded on April 2, 2018. Filming for the series takes place primarily in Los Angeles; additional filming for the series takes place in Seattle. The station in Station 19 is based on Seattle's Station 20, located in its Queen Anne neighborhood.

Release

Broadcast
Station 19 began airing on March 22, 2018, on ABC in the United States. CTV acquired the broadcast rights for Canada. Sky Living acquired the rights to air the series in the UK and Ireland. With the show later moving to Disney+, full seasons are available in Canada following their release on the CTV network.

Marketing
In early December 2017, Entertainment Weekly released first look images of the series.

Reception

Critical response
For the first season, the review aggregator website Rotten Tomatoes reported a 65% approval rating with an average rating of 6/10 based on 17 reviews. The website's consensus reads, "Fans will bask in the familiar glow from Station 19, though anyone who doesn't already indulge in the soapy delights of Shondaland may not feel the spark." Metacritic, which uses a weighted average, assigned a score of 55 out of 100 based on 10 critics, indicating "mixed or average reviews".

Ratings

Accolades

References

External links

 

2010s American workplace drama television series
2018 American television series debuts
2020s American workplace drama television series
American action television series
American television spin-offs
American Broadcasting Company original programming
2010s American LGBT-related drama television series
2020s American LGBT-related drama television series
English-language television shows
Seattle Fire Department
Television franchises
Television series about firefighting
Television series by ABC Studios
Television series by Shondaland
Television shows filmed in Los Angeles
Television shows set in Seattle
Television shows set in Washington (state)
Television shows about the COVID-19 pandemic
Grey's Anatomy